HMS Bentinck was a  during World War II.

Originally destined for the US Navy as a turbo-electric (TE) type , HMS Bentinck was provisionally given the name USS Bull (later this name was reassigned to DE 693) however the delivery was diverted to the Royal Navy before the launch.

Actions

HMS Bentinck served exclusively with the 4th Escort Group taking part in operations in the Arctic (Russian Convoys) and the North Atlantic.

U-1051 was forced to the surface by the use of depth charges, then a gun battle ensued with U-1051 finally sinking after it had been rammed by HMS Aylmer. This action resulted in the loss of all 47 crew of U-1051.

On 8 April 1945 the submarine  was sunk in the North Atlantic south-west of Ireland, at position  by the frigates HMS Bentinck and HMS Calder. U-774 was attacked by the use of depth charges after its periscope was spotted by a lookout on HMS Calder. This action resulted in loss of all 44 crew aboard U-774.

U-636 was attacked by the use of depth charges. This action resulted in loss of all 42 crew aboard U-636.

General information

Pennant (UK): K 314
Pennant (US): DE 52

References
 The Captain Class Frigates in the Second World War by Donald Collingwood. published by Leo Cooper (1998), .
 The Buckley-Class Destroyer Escorts by Bruce Hampton Franklin, published by Chatham Publishing (1999), .
 German U-Boat Losses During World War II by Axel Niestle, published by United States Naval Inst (1998), .

External links
 uboat.net page for HMS Bentinck
 uboat.net page for U-1051
 uboat.net page for U-774
 uboat.net page for U-636
 captainclassfrigates.co.uk

Captain-class frigates
Buckley-class destroyer escorts
World War II frigates of the United Kingdom
Ships built in Hingham, Massachusetts
1943 ships